Vedius Aquila was a military commander of ancient Rome who lived in the 1st century CE. He commanded the thirteenth legion, and was one of Otho's generals during the Year of the Four Emperors. He was present in the First Battle of Bedriacum, in which Otho's troops were defeated by those of Vitellius, in 69.

After Otho's suicide, Vedius Aquila subsequently espoused Vespasian's party.

References

1st-century Romans
Ancient Roman generals
People of the Year of the Four Emperors
Date of birth unknown
Date of death unknown
Generals of Otho